Kok  or kokákia (meaning multiple smaller kok, as they are typically served multiple) is a Greek profiterole consisting of pastry cream, chocolate glaze and syrup. It is sometimes additionally topped with nuts or flakes of various kinds.

See also
 List of choux pastry dishes
 List of pastries

References 

Greek pastries